Greene Avenue (officially in ) is a north-south street in Westmount and Montreal, Quebec, Canada. It links Sherbrooke Street West in the north and Saint-Ambroise Street West, near the Atwater Market and Lachine Canal in the south. North of Sherbrooke, it is known as Mount Pleasant Avenue.

Greene Avenue is locally known for its upscale shops, restaurants and antique dealers. Notable structures and businesses on the street include the western entrance to Westmount Square and the studios for radio station CKGM.

Greene Avenue was said to be given its name in 1884, after the area's former landowner, Edward K. Greene, although other sources point to G.A. Greene as the namesake.

Further reading
Ville de Montréal, Les rues de Montréal, Répertoire historique, Montréal, Méridien, 1995, p. 209

References 

Streets in Montreal
Westmount, Quebec
Shopping districts and streets in Canada